The Gillespie Dam is a concrete gravity dam located on the Gila River between the towns of Buckeye and Gila Bend, Arizona. The dam was constructed during the 1920s for primarily irrigation purposes. A portion of the dam failed unexpectedly in 1993 during unusually heavy rains.

History
The Gillespie Dam was constructed circa 1920 by a local rancher, Frank Gillespie (Gillespie Land and Irrigation Company), to replace an existing structure.  As the dam was located at an important river crossing that would later become U.S. Route 80, the Arizona Highway Department – the predecessor to the Arizona Department of Transportation – constructed a concrete apron at the foot of the dam to allow for vehicular crossings.  As the dam was a simple spillover construction, during times of heavy runoff cars would have to be pulled through the flow by trucks, and during floods could not cross at all.

In anticipation of the formation of the United States Highway System in 1926, the Highway Department commissioned the construction of the Gillespie Dam Bridge, a steel truss bridge just downstream from the dam.  The bridge was completed and opened to traffic on August 1, 1927, at a cost of US$320,000 (US$3,950,000 in 2007).  The bridge, which was at the time the longest highway bridge in the state of Arizona, was immediately incorporated into the highway system as Route 80.  The bridge carried US 80 traffic until 1956 when the highway was decommissioned, devolving to a county highway, thus placing the bridge under Maricopa County care.  The bridge was added to the National Register of Historic Places on May 5, 1981.

Townsite
Gillespie was reported to have planned to spend $1,000,000 building the town, including "graded streets, cement sidewalks, business blocks and a hotel, many residences, water and lighting systems and all other modern conveniences."

Failure
The winter months of 1993 saw unusually high rainfall amounts that resulted in record flows through central Arizona rivers and streams, including the Salt River, a major tributary to the Gila upstream from the Gillespie Dam. While the precise cause of the failure is unknown, the extreme flooding was almost certainly a contributing factor.

Due to the failure, three underground natural gas lines were exposed and later severed by the floodwaters.  The bridge downstream survived, and was deemed safe for travel.

The remnants of the dam remain in place and the area is largely accessible to the public.  A small earthen embankment exists to divert water into nearby canals.

Gallery

References

Gila River
Dams in Arizona
Buildings and structures in Maricopa County, Arizona